Richard Maynard may refer to:

 Richard Maynard (actor), American actor
 Richard Maynard (television producer) (1942–2007), American educator, writer and television producer
 Richard Maynard (photographer) (1832–1907), British Columbia photographer
 Richard Maynard, a character in Moon Over Buffalo, a comedy by Ken Ludwig
 Richard Maynard, a character in Spooks (2002) played by Nicholas Farrell

See also
 Dick Maynard (1897–1979), Australian footballer